Abdallah Albert is a South Sudanese politician. He was Minister for Wildlife Conservation and Tourism in the Cabinet of South Sudan. He was appointed to that position on 10 July 2011. In 2013 he joined the armed opposition under Riek Machar. In 2018 he broke away and announced himself as the leader of the Eastern Front Army that defends the interests of Eastern Equatoria.

External links
Website of Government of South Sudan

See also
 SPLM
 SPLA
 Cabinet of South Sudan

References

Living people
Government ministers of South Sudan
Year of birth missing (living people)
South Sudanese Muslims